The Battle of Hengyang was the longest defense of a single city of the entire Second Sino-Japanese War. When Changsha fell to the Imperial Japanese Army on June 19, 1944, Hengyang became their next target. The reorganized 11th Army, consisting of 10 divisions, 4 brigades, and over 110,000 men, assumed the task of attacking Hengyang.

The city was an important railroad junction and Hengyang Airport was used by USAAC General Claire Lee Chennault's Flying Tigers which were engaged in bombing operations of the Japanese homeland. Therefore, Field Marshal Hajime Sugiyama, chief of imperial staff and war minister, ordered the city must be taken at all costs.

On June 22, Japanese 68th and 116th divisions received their orders to attack the city and to take it within 2 days, which started the 48 days of siege and defense.

Background
After successfully capturing Changsha on 18 June 1944, the Japanese 11th army, led by Lieutenant General Isamu Yokoyama (橫山 勇) continued its drive southwards. Yokoyama's plans were to capture Hengyang and Guilin to launch an attack on Liuzhou, thus concluding Operation Ichi-Go.

The Allies' successful execution of Operation Overlord in Normandy in 1944 drew attention toward Europe as victory against Nazi Germany was anticipated. On the other hand, however, China was nearing a breaking point: following the loss of Changsha, failure to hold Hengyang could result in the Japanese crossing into Guilin and driving west towards Guizhou, from where they could directly attack Chongqing, thus placing the Chinese wartime capital and military headquarters in imminent danger.

Chinese supreme commander Generalissimo Chiang Kai-shek's relocation of 15 elite divisions to support American general Joseph Stilwell's forces in Burma on 15 June resulted in Chinese forces in Hunan and Guangxi being spread out very thinly. On the other hand, the Japanese offensive involved more troops than any other battle since the war's start, with General Yokoyama deploying 400,000 troops in 150 battalions.

American involvement
Although the Chinese army did gain access to American lend-lease weapons by mid-1944, this was severely restricted, as most of this equipment was still in India, held up by General Stilwell for his forces in Burma. During the siege of Hengyang, Stilwell ordered the destruction of Guilin's airfield and removal of its outer bridge on 21 June.

Changsha campaign
When the Japanese army captured Changsha and pressed southwards, the Chinese units seemed powerless, because during the defense of Changsha, they dispersed in the face of completely superior Japanese power. Logistics and communication were thus very difficult to maintain. Although Yang Sen's 27th army group and Wang Lingji's 30th army group did fiercely engage the Japanese army at Liling and Chaling respectively, they were unable to stop the advance of the overwhelming Japanese force. As a result, Hengyang was surrounded and unable to receive outside support.

The rapid loss of Changsha came as a shock to the Chinese military headquarters, and also resulted in the Chinese having a difficult time to reestablish their line of defense due to overwhelming Japanese advantages in manpower and material. Chiang Kai-shek hurriedly contacted two-star Lieutenant General Fang Xianjue(:zh:方先覺), commander of the 10th Corps, ordering him to hold the city for two weeks, in a desperate attempt to buy time for the HQ to fully analyse the  situation.

Defenses
Led by General Fang, the 10th Corps had previously participated in the Battle of Changde in November–December 1943 during which it suffered heavy casualties. After the siege of Changde was successfully lifted, the Corps was relocated to Mount Heng for replacements and resupplies. Only on 2 June was it deployed to protect Hengyang.

The 10th Corps consisted of 3 divisions: the 3rd, 10th, and 190th. In particular, the 10th and 190th division were reserve divisions, and the latter had yet to receive actual troops: it had an en cadre, but no soldiers. Later, the corps gained the temporary 54th division, which was originally stationed at Hengyang, but this division only had the strength of a single regiment. On paper, the Chinese army had 4 divisions, but in reality, they only had 7 regiments. Even with the addition of its mountain artillery company, field artillery company and anti-tank company, its total strength did not exceed approximately 17,000 men.

Strategic importance
Hengyang was a small rectangular city situated in the south-eastern plains of Hunan province, south of the foothills of Mount Heng (Hunan). It spanned 500 m from east to west and up to 1600 m from north to south. The Beijing-Guangzhou and Hunan-Guangxi Railways intersected at Hengyang, making it the transportation hub linking the provinces of Hunan, Jiangxi, Guangxi, and Guizhou. The city was also the gateway to south-western China. Additionally, the Hengyang Airport was used by USAAC General Claire Lee Chennault's Flying Tigers, which were engaged in bombing operations of the Japanese homeland. Thus, its military and economic importance made it an inevitable place of contention. A Chinese failure to hold the city could result in the Japanese crossing into Guilin and driving west towards Guizhou, from where they could directly attack Chongqing, thus placing the Chinese wartime capital and military headquarters in imminent danger.

Along Hengyang's eastern border, the Xiang River ran from north to south. North of the city, the Zheng River ran from west to east. West of the city was marshlands. Thus, the only terrain favourable for the Japanese armoured and mechanized units lay in the south, where hills ran westward along the Hunan-Guangxi Railway starting from the Jiangxi Hall(:zh:江西會館), including Fengshushan(:zh:楓樹山), Zhangjiashan(:zh:張家山), and Huxingchao(:zh:虎形巢). By advancing westwards and crossing the Xiang River, the Japanese could directly attack the city from the south. Hence, the outer southern gate of the city became a critical location of contention from the outset.

Chinese defensive disposition
General Fang deployed his most elite unit, the reserve 10th division, led by General Ge Xiancai(:zh:葛先才) to protect the vitally important southern gate, while the reserve 190th division was deployed on the eastern flank, responsible for protecting the area outside the city east of the Xiang River, bounded by Quanxi(:zh:泉溪) in the east, and Wumaguicao(:zh:五馬歸槽) and the Hengyang Airport in the west. The temporary 54th division was deployed just north of the 190th, at Fengjiachong(:zh:馮家冲), on the west bank of the Leishui River. The 3rd division was deployed west of the city, its area of responsibility spanning from Gaojiatang(:zh:高家塘) in the north to the western bus station in the south. The corps command post was originally situated at Fengshushan, in the south of the city, but was later relocated to the central bank, in the centre of the city.

Given that the Japanese captured Changsha on 18 June, just 16 days after the Chinese 10th Corps entered Hengyang, the Chinese had very limited time to prepare their defenses. In spite of this, the Chinese commander General Fang ordered a mandatory evacuation for 300,000 inhabitants of the city, and, recognising his force's inferiority in manpower and material, abandoned some pre-existing defensive positions south of the Hunan-Guangxi Railway in order to minimise the area which his force had to defend, and began to construct earthworks, trenches, pillboxes and bunkers. The Chinese created man-made cliffs of 6 meters high, and covered the place with well-placed mortar and light artillery. In the hills to the south, General Fang deployed machine guns on the summits flanking saddles, creating tight killzones over the open ground, where abatises were also deployed. This meant that the Japanese only had two ways to advance: to scale the cliffs with ladders, or to brave the machine gun fire and run across the open fields.

Just before the Japanese launched their attack, the Chinese Army HQ was able to spare some American artillery for the defense of the city. However, the 10th Corps had to send its artillery battalion to Kunming to collect it. The battalion traveled to Jinchengjiang(:zh:金城江) via train, and marched to Kunming from there. En route back to Jinchengjiang after collecting the equipment, however, it found the Hunan-Guangxi Railway to be flooded with refugees. The battalion could only abandon some of the equipment and hurry back to Hengyang. By the time they arrived, the battle had already begun. The battalion managed to bring back 9  anti-tank guns, 6  field guns, 26 mortars, and 2 bazookas, weapons which would play a major role in the Chinese defense.

Battle

Japanese commander Lieutenant General Yokoyama planned to take the city within two days. On 22 June, the Imperial Japanese Army Air Service began dropping incendiary bombs on the city, and a 30,000 strong force made up of the Japanese 68th and 116th Divisions of the 11th Army attacked the city at eight o'clock that night, with the 68th attacking from the south and the 116th attacking from the west.

Although faced with concentrated heavy artillery fire, the Chinese held fast. Only when the Japanese troops began assaulting the Chinese defensive positions did their commanders realize something was not right as their troops rapidly fell to small arms fire from the Chinese.

Japanese 68th division veteran Yamauchi Iwao (山内 巖) recalled in an interview in 1995:

During the attack, Japanese soldiers fell one by one, making the sound of 'pa-da, pa-da'. Later, our platoon commander was the first to reach the frontmost pillbox. Later, I reached it as well. Soldiers as near as five metres behind me all fell - 'pa-da, pa-da'. After withdrawing, almost our entire company had been killed: there were only about 30 survivors.

The Japanese forces failing to make any progress for two days straight, Lieutenant General Sakuma Tamehito (佐久間為人), commander of the Japanese 68th Division, took it upon himself to personally inspect the battlefield from a hill. Shortly afterwards, a barrage of mortar rounds fell on his position, critically wounding the General and a number of his staff. These rounds had come from the mortar battery of the Chinese 28th regiment, reserve 10th division, stationed at Fengshushan.

Battery commander Bai Tianlin (:zh:白天霖) recalled in an interview in 1995:

[700 to 900] metres in front [of our position] was a place called Oujiating(歐家町). There were at least 7 to 8 [enemy troops], even 30 of them. As soon as I saw it, [I thought], "this is a good target. How could there be so many [enemy troops] gathered in one location to reconnoitre our position? This shows that it could not be a regiment commander." After I saw it, I immediately made the decision. Each mortar was to fire one round - concentrated fire. In an instant, eight rounds were fired and simultaneously landed on that group of [enemy troops]. It was enjoyable to watch.

A severe shortage of ammunition resulted in the Chinese adopting a "Three Don't's Policy"(三不主義): Don't shoot at what you can't see (看不見不打); Don't shoot at what you can't aim at (瞄不准不打); and Don't shoot at what you can't kill (打不死不打). While such policy allowed them to hold fast in the early stages of the battle, it also necessitated fierce close quarters combat.

Company commander in the 10th Corps' reconnaissance battalion Zang Xiaoxia (:zh:臧肖侠) recalled in an interview in 1995:

I requested mortar fire. I waited for a very long time, until dusk, before a mortar platoon commander came. He fired seven or eight rounds and stopped. I asked him, "Why did you fire the mortar like that?". 
He replied, "Sir, we are out of mortar rounds." 
I said, "What is going on?" 
He replied, "What rounds do you need? My mortar is an  mortar. We had used up all our  mortar rounds ages ago. We still have some  mortar rounds remaining [captured from the Japanese]. How many rounds do you think they can grind down in a day? The staff's hands are already worn out from all the grinding."

Despite incurring heavy casualties through seven days and nights of continuous assault, the Japanese 68th and 116th divisions, which had a combined strength of 30,000 men, failed to take any ground from the 17,000-strong Chinese 10th Corps. As a result, General Yokoyama called a halt to the attack on 2 July.

During this time, the Chinese 190th division withdrew from their original positions east of the Xiang River, falling back to the city to make their last stand.

By this time, the small city of Hengyang had already been reduced to rubble by continuous Japanese air strikes.

Chinese medic Wang Nutao (:zh:汪怒濤) from the reserve 10th division recalled in an interview in 1995:

Every evening, the Japanese planes would fly bombing runs with incendiary bombs. Afterwards, all patients would no longer be sent to field hospitals. No patients were sent any more. There were no more patients. How could it be that there are no patients in a battle? The patients no longer went to the rear, since they knew that they were going to die either way, and chose to die fighting the Japanese.

However, the Chinese Air Force, stationed at Zhijiang, also launched numerous air attacks against the invading Japanese forces throughout this battle. These attacks had a positive effect on the morale of the Chinese troops on the ground.

On the morning of 11 July, the Japanese launched their second try, and did not score any major success despite some small gains. On the other hand, while the Chinese were still able to hold the line, their ammunition shortages had become an increasingly severe problem by now: their original supply of 10 days' worth of ammunition having been substantially depleted by half a month of intense fighting. Hence, they resorted to engaging the enemy in close quarters with hand grenades.

By mid-July, the Japanese troops no longer used ladders to climb up the cliffs. Instead, they used the piles of their corpses as ramps to scale the cliffs.

Zang Xiaoxia (:zh:臧肖侠), a company commander in the 10th Corps' reconnaissance battalion, recalled in an interview in 1995:

At that time I saw that we only had one pillbox left. With no way to resupply, I, as the company commander, could do nothing else but stay in the pillbox and defend it with my life. I jumped inside with a machine gun. The soldier who was already there, said to me while firing at the enemy, "Sir, what are you doing? You shouldn't be here. You should be at the company command post directing the entire company."
I said, "the rest of the company has been wiped out. This pillbox here is all we have left. I'll fight alongside you until death."
The pillbox had two firing ports. We each fired out of one of them. It was only until I entered the pillbox that I saw the enemies' corpses piling up like mountains, blocking the firing port, making it impossible to shoot through. It was only after shooting the corpses to pieces that I could see  through.

On 18 July, the Japanese were still unable to break through the Chinese southern defensive lines. Pressured with increasingly high casualties, General  Yokoyama once again halted the offensive. On 4 August, Japanese Field Marshal Shunroku Hata (畑 俊六) ordered three divisions to reinforce the 68th and 116th Divisions, increasing the total manpower to 110,000 troops. The 40th Division attacked from the northwest, while the 58th attacked from the north and the 13th attacked from the east.  After four days of intense bombing and artillery shelling, the Chinese garrison was reduced to 2,000 wounded men, less than a regiment (3,000).

On 6 August, the Japanese 57th Brigade launched a fierce assault on the Hengyang hospital. The Chinese reserve 10th division's 8th regiment's mortar battery fired its last eight mortar rounds. The Japanese killed around 1,000 wounded Chinese in the Hengyang hospital before engaging in negotiations. On 7 August, General Fang sent a telegram to Chongqing headquarters. In this message, he said: "The enemy broke in from the north this morning. We are out of ammunition and replacements. I have devoted my life to my country. Goodbye." After sending the message, Fang ordered his staff to destroy all communications equipment.  The next day, the Japanese army broke into the city and captured General Fang. Fang actually tried to commit suicide, but his officers stopped him and tried to negotiate a truce with the Japanese. After the Japanese agreed not to harm the civilian population and to treat the Chinese wounded humanely, General Fang ordered the remaining Chinese soldiers to lay down their arms. The day was 8 August 1944.

Aftermath
Although the Japanese army suffered huge losses, they held the Chinese commanders in high regard. Japanese Emperor Hirohito personally appointed General Fang Xianjue as commander of a puppet unit, made up of his remaining garrison and some Chinese turncoats. But the local Japanese commanders never trusted him or his officers; they were eventually placed under house arrest.  Later studies showed that on 7 August 1944, the day before the Japanese army broke into the city, Chiang Kai-shek had sent a telegram to General Fang, saying: "Reinforcements are on the way. They will arrive at your position tomorrow with no delay." However, Fang never received the message. Chinese special forces under General Dai Li(:zh:戴笠), head of China's wartime intelligence service "Military-Statistics Bureau" of National Military Council, carried out a daring rescue mission and freed General Fang and his officers in December 1944. They returned to Chongqing to a hero's welcome and were decorated with the Order of Blue Sky and White Sun, the highest honor for a Chinese commander.

The delay at Hengyang cost the Imperial Japanese Army considerable time and the Tojo cabinet collapsed as the war was not in Japan's favor anymore. Lieutenant General Yokoyama was later relieved of his command due to his refusal to obey orders from General Yasuji Okamura (:zh:岡村寧次), commander-in-chief of the Japanese China Expeditionary Forces.  The Japanese operation in Hunan did manage to push Chinese troops out of the area, but they could not secure the territory around the railroad or safely transfer war materials to different regions. Because of increased activity of Chinese troops and nationalist guerrillas, they could take no more Chinese land.

References

Hengyang
1944 in China
1944 in Japan